The Discovery Center of Springfield (DCS) in Springfield, Missouri, is an interactive, hands-on science center dedicated to inspiring curiosity and a life-long love of learning through memorable and engaging hands-on experiences in STEM (Science, Technology, Engineering, and Mathematics)  In December 2021, inaugural grand prize winner of the Center for Education Reform and media partner Forbes STOP Award. The Wall Street Journal editorial board wrote about the museum that became a school winning the $1 million award.

At the onset of the COVID-19 pandemic in March 2020, the Discovery Center remained open and delivered on their mission by providing emergency, licensed childcare for the families of healthcare workers and first responders. DCS provided over 200,000 hours of free childcare and over 50,000 free meals and snacks.

Its history goes back to the late 1980s when a group of community volunteers led by the junior league of Springfield began a feasibility study for a children's hands-on museum project for Springfield and the Ozark region. It was determined that a hands-on museum could provide a unique learning environment that would help cultivate children's curiosity and imagination, confidence, communication, interaction and interpretive skills. They believed the potential exhibits and programs developed could appeal to all ages and stages of learners. Individual learning styles of children and families would be nurtured with the intent to excite and engage visitors on various educational topics with the goal to inspire a love of learning to empower children to have a more positive outcome in their academic and lifelong pursuits.

In 1991 Discovery Center of Springfield was incorporated. Over the next six years the volunteer board of directors and other committed community volunteers planned the building purchase and renovation, exhibits and program development and business operation. Since its opening in January 1998, the DCS has developed and added a great number of programs and exhibits. Collaboration has been the key to the success of this regional facility. Likewise, it is critical that the DCS partners with other agencies, individuals, foundations and businesses to achieve their respective goals. The DCS has established itself as a leader in the region of unique and engaging educational experiences. In 2000, they completed a master plan process and determined it was time to begin planning for expansion. In September 2006 DCS celebrated the opening of a new 30,000 sq. ft. LEED Gold certified building expansion with additional exhibits. This expansion and the educational messages evident throughout the building have led the way to an impressive environmental sustainability movement in this area.

References

Charlotte McCoy, Discovery Center

Children's museums in Missouri
Museums in Springfield, Missouri
Science museums in Missouri